Loco is a loa, patron of healers and plants, especially trees in the Vodou religion. He is a racine (root) and a rada loa. Among several other loa, he is linked with the poteau mitan or center post in a Vodou peristyle.

He is the husband of the loa Ayizan and just as she is the archetypal mambo (priestess), Loco is considered the first houngan (priest). As the spiritual parents of the priesthood, he and his wife are two of the loa involved in the kanzo initiation rites in which the priest/ess to be is given the asson (sacred rattle and tool of the priesthood). Both are powerful guardians of "regleman" or the correct and appropriate form of Vodoun service. 

He is similar to the Arawak deity Louquo, a founding ancestor of the Arawak people. 
He's related to the Iroko and the Ceiba pentandra, two sacred trees, one in Africa and one in Mesoamerica.

References

Voodoo gods
Nature gods
Tutelary deities